Gilbert Eugene "Lefty" Schegg (August 29, 1889 – February 27, 1963) was a pitcher in Major League Baseball. He played for the Washington Senators.

References

External links

1889 births
1963 deaths
Major League Baseball pitchers
Washington Senators (1901–1960) players
Baseball players from Ohio